Rebecca Alitwala Kadaga (born 24 May 1956) is a Ugandan lawyer and politician who served as the Speaker of the Parliament of Uganda from 19 May 2011 until 21 May 2021. She currently serves as the First Deputy Prime Minister of Uganda. She concurrently serves as Minister for East African Community Affairs, in the Cabinet of Uganda.

She is the first woman to be elected Speaker in the history of the Parliament of Uganda. She succeeded Edward Ssekandi, who served as Speaker from 2001 to 2011.

She is also the current Member of Parliament (MP) for the Kamuli District Women's Constituency, Busoga sub-region, a position she has held since 1989.

Background and education
She was born in Kamuli District, Eastern Uganda, on 24 May 1956. Rebecca Kadaga attended Namasagali College for her high school education. She studied law at Makerere University, graduating with the degree of Bachelor of Laws (LLB), in 1978. She went on to obtain a Diploma in Legal Practice from the Law Development Center in Kampala in 1979. In 2000, she obtained a Diploma in Women's Law from the University of Zimbabwe. In 2003, she obtained the degree of Master of Arts (MA), specializing in Women's Law, also from the University of Zimbabwe. In 2019, Nkumba University, a private university in Uganda, awarded Kadaga an honorary Doctor of Laws degree.

Work experience
Between 1984 and 1988, she was in private law practice. From 1989 to 1996, she served as the member of parliament for Kamuli District in the District Woman's Constituency. She served as the Chairperson of the University Council for Mbarara University, between 1993 and 1996. During 1996, she served as Secretary General of the East African Women Parliamentarians Association.

From 1996 to 1998, Rebecca Kadaga was the Ugandan Minister of State for Regional Cooperation (Africa and the Middle East). From 1998 to 1999, she was Minister of State for Communication and Aviation, and from 1999 to 2000, she was Minister of Parliamentary Affairs. She was elected as Deputy Speaker of Parliament in 2001, a position that she held until 19 May 2011, when she was elected Speaker of Parliament.

Following the February 2016 general election, Kadaga was unanimously re-elected as Speaker of Parliament on 19 May 2016.

On December 20, 2017, Kadaga presided over the Ugandan Parliament while passing an amendment to the Constitution which, among other measures, eliminated the requirement that candidates vying for the presidency be under 75 years of age. The amendment essentially gave Museveni leeway to run for President of Uganda for his sixth term in office.

On 14 January 2021, Kadaga was re-elected to Parliament as a Woman Representative for Kamuli District. Consequently, she embarked on a campaign to retain her position as Speaker of Parliament for a third term. Kadaga lost the Speaker Vote to her former deputy Jacob Oulanyah after falling out of favor with her party, the National Resistance Movement (NRM).

Parliamentary duties
Besides her duties as speaker of the Ugandan Parliament, she sat on the following parliamentary committees:
 Appointments Committee – The Committee reviews all Cabinet appointments by the President, and may approve or reject an appointment: The Speaker chairs the committee
 The Parliamentary Commission – The Speaker chairs the Commission
 The Business Committee – The Speaker chairs the committee

Controversy
Kadaga vowed to pass the Uganda Anti-Homosexuality Bill through parliament by December 2012. The bill – sometimes referred to as the "Kill the Gays bill" – at one time sought to make acts of homosexuality punishable by death or life imprisonment but later removed the death penalty option from the bill. She says it will become law since most Ugandans "are demanding it".

In December 2012, Kadaga was in Rome to give a speech at the Seventh Session of the Consultative Assembly of Parliamentarians for the International Criminal Court and the Rule of Law.

Reports circulated that Kadaga received a blessing from Pope Benedict XVI at a Vatican mass. Soon after the news broke, Vatican spokesman Father Federico Lombardi issued a statement that said: “relations with the delegation were not out of the ordinary and no blessing was given.” The group of Ugandan MPs greeted the Pope “just like any other individuals attending an audience with the Pope would” and this was “by no means a specific sign of approval of Kadaga’s actions or proposals.” 

In March 2020, during the COVID-19 pandemic, Kadaga tweeted that a "spray, which instantly kills the Corona virus, has been discovered & is to be co-produced in Uganda". She  gave an impression that what was later on to be understood as a simple sanitizer was actually treatment for COVID-19 and received so much backlash from Ugandans on social media and professional bodies in the medical field like the Uganda Medical Association, and the Pharmaceutical Society of Uganda. She hit back by calling the people of the Association brainless.

In April 2020, during the COVID-19 pandemic, Kadaga and her fellow members of parliament allocated to themselves over 10 billion Uganda shillings of what was meant to be relief funds for efforts to fight against the pandemic and its associated socio-economic disruptions.

See also
 Cabinet of Uganda
 Parliament of Uganda
 List of speakers of the Parliament of Uganda
 Kamuli District

References

External links
Personal Website
Website of the Parliament of Uganda
Anti-Gay Bill

1956 births
Living people
Makerere University alumni
Law Development Centre alumni
University of Zimbabwe alumni
20th-century Ugandan lawyers
Ugandan women lawyers
Women legislative speakers
Speakers of the Parliament of Uganda
Government ministers of Uganda
People from Kamuli District
People from Eastern Region, Uganda
20th-century Ugandan women politicians
20th-century Ugandan politicians
21st-century Ugandan women politicians
21st-century Ugandan politicians
Women government ministers of Uganda
Women members of the Parliament of Uganda
Members of the Parliament of Uganda
National Resistance Movement politicians